Madrasta is Spanish for stepmother. It may refer to:

 Madrasta (film), a 1996 Philippine drama film
 Madrasta (TV series), a Philippine television drama series

See also 
 La Madrastra (disambiguation)
 Stepmother
 The Stepmother (disambiguation)